Chang Yoon-hyun (born July 11, 1967) is a South Korean film director. Chang's directorial debut, the romance film The Contact (1997), was the second best selling film of 1997. It also catapulted actress Jeon Do-yeon to stardom in her film debut. His second feature Tell Me Something (1999) - billed as a "hard-core thriller", was one of 1999's biggest hits.

Filmography

As director 
Oh! Country of Dreams (1989)
The Night Before the Strike (1990)
The Contact (1997)
Tell Me Something (1999)
Some (2004)
Hwang Jin Yi (2007)
Gabi (2012)
Peaceful Island (2015)

As screenwriter 
The Contact (1997)
Tell Me Something (1999)

As producer 
Love Wind Love Song (1999) (also credited for music)
Tell Me Something (1999)

As executive producer 
Flower Island (2001)
Wild Card (2003)
Liar (2004)
R-Point (2004) (also credited as planner)
Ssunday Seoul (2006)

As other crew 
Another Public Enemy (2005)
King and the Clown (2005)
Hanbando (2006)

As investor 
Princess Aurora (2005)
Lost in Love (2006)
Ssunday Seoul (2006)
The Customer Is Always Right (2006)
Love Phobia (2006)
Hanbando (2006)
Fly High (2006)
Puzzle (2006)
Radio Star (2006)
Righteous Ties (2006)
Project Makeover (2006)

Awards 
1997 34th Grand Bell Awards: Best Adapted Screenplay (The Contact)
1998 18th Korean Association of Film Critics Awards: Best New Director (The Contact)

References

External links 
 
 
 

1967 births
Living people
South Korean film directors
South Korean screenwriters
South Korean film producers
Place of birth missing (living people)